The 2012 French Road Cycling Cup was the 21st edition of the French Road Cycling Cup and was won by Samuel Dumoulin.

Compared to the previous edition, two new events were added to the calendar, namely the Classic Loire Atlantique and the Route Adélie. The defending champion from 2011 was Tony Gallopin.

Events

Final standings

Individual 
Note: only French riders and riders of French teams are eligible to score points

Team 
Note: only French teams are eligible to score points

External links
  Official website

French Road Cycling Cup
French Road Cycling Cup
2012 in French sport